The Green-Evans House is a historic mansion in Lynchburg, Tennessee, U.S..

History
The house was built in 1858 on a plantation for Townsend Port Green, who lived here with his wife Mary Ann Landiss and their 14 children. During the American Civil War of 1861–1865, two of his sons joined the Confederate States Army and served under General Nathan Bedford Forrest. By 1885, the house was purchased by Daniel S. Evans, a saloon keeper.

Architectural significance
The house was designed in the Greek Revival architectural style. It has been listed on the National Register of Historic Places since December 17, 1992.

References

Houses on the National Register of Historic Places in Tennessee
Greek Revival architecture in Tennessee
Houses completed in 1858
Buildings and structures in Moore County, Tennessee